Seehorn is an unincorporated community in northern Pike County, Illinois, United States.

The community lies just south of the Pike - Adams county line. It is on the eastern edge of the Mississippi River bottomlands approximately six miles northeast of Hannibal, Missouri.

References

Unincorporated communities in Pike County, Illinois
Unincorporated communities in Illinois